CPR Montrose Yard is a former Canadian Pacific Railway marshalling yard in Niagara Falls, Ontario, Canada. It was originally built for the New York Central Railroad. The property is currently home to the Thundering Waters Golf Course.

Rail_yards_in_Ontario
Canadian Pacific Railway facilities
Transport in Niagara Falls, Ontario
Rail infrastructure in the Regional Municipality of Niagara